Robert Maxwell was a Scottish footballer who played in the Football League for Darwen (making the move south along with Michael McAvoy).

References

Date of birth unknown
Date of death unknown
Scottish footballers
English Football League players
Association football defenders
Darwen F.C. players
19th-century births